Jonathon Young (born May 8, 1973) is a Canadian actor known for his role of Nikola Tesla on the SyFy show Sanctuary. Appearances include The Fog, Eureka, and Stargate Atlantis. Young is a well-respected stage actor. He is the co-founder of Electric Company Theatre in Vancouver, British Columbia, Canada in which he is also the artistic director, playwright, and actor.

Early life 
Born on May 8, 1973 in Richmond Hill, Ontario, he was raised in Vernon, British Columbia, along with his brother and sister. Their father was a school teacher who started a community theatre in Armstrong, British Columbia. At a "Q&A" after the play No Exit, Young told the audience that his father often brought him and his sister to watch him act and that this is where his love for theatre began. Becoming an actor was never a choice, but rather just something he knew he was going to do.

Career 
Young is a graduate of the Studio 58 theatre school at Langara College, Vancouver, British Columbia. In 1996 he co-founded Electric Company Theatre along with fellow Studio 58 alumni Kim Collier, David Hudgins, and Kevin Kerr. He is a multiple Jessie Richardson Theatre Award winner. His play Palace Grand was commissioned for production by Vancouver's PuSh International Performing Arts Festival in 2008. 

Young has collaborated with the contemporary dance theatre company Kidd Pivot, first in the award-winning "Betroffenheit" (premiered 2015, co-created by Young and choreographer and dancer Crystal Pite), then in "Revisor" (2019), which is a dance interpretation of Nikolai Gogol's play The Government Inspector.

Filmography

Dance / Theatre

References

External links
 

1973 births
Canadian male television actors
Living people
Male actors from Ontario
People from Richmond Hill, Ontario
Langara College people